This page lists Japan-related articles with romanized titles beginning with the letter M. For names of people, please list by surname (i.e., "Tarō Yamada" should be listed under "Y", not "T"). Please also ignore particles (e.g. "a", "an", "the") when listing articles (i.e., "A City with No People" should be listed under "City").

Ma
Mabi, Okayama
Maborosi
Machi Koro
Machida, Tokyo
Macross Plus
Macross Seven
Maebaru, Fukuoka
Maebashi, Gunma
Ai Maeda (actress)
Ai Maeda (voice actress)
Maeda Toshiie
Maeda Toshinaga
Maeda Toshitsune
Maegashira
Toshiyuki Maesaka
Maetsue, Ōita
Magatama
Magic Knight Rayearth
Magical girl
Magical girlfriend
Magical nyan-nyan Taruto
Mahayana
Maibara Station
Maid in Japan
Maihara, Shiga
Mainichi Shimbun
Mainland Japan
Maisaka, Shizuoka
Maison Ikkoku
Maizuru, Kyoto
Majutsushi Orphen
Maki, Niigata (Kambara)
Maki, Niigata (Kubiki)
Makino Tsuyoshi
Makino, Shiga
The Makioka Sisters (film)
The Makioka Sisters (novel)
Makisu
Makiyakinabe
Makizono, Kagoshima
Makurazaki, Kagoshima
Malice Mizer
MAWI
Mampuku-ji
Mana (musician)
Man'yōshū
Manchukuo
Manchuria
Maneki Neko
Manga
Mangaka
Maniwa District, Okayama
Manju (food)
Manno, Kagawa
Manriki
Manzai
Manzanar
Maple Town
Marco Polo Bridge Incident
Maria-sama ga Miteru
Mario
Mario Kart 64
Mario Kart: Double Dash
Mario Party
Mario's Super Picross
Marmalade Boy
Martial arts
Martian Successor Nadesico
Marugame, Kagawa
Marunouchi
Marvel vs. Capcom (series)
Masaki, Ehime
Masaki Toshimitsu Dannoshin
Masaoka Shiki
Mashiki, Kumamoto
Mask of Glass
Masked Rider (TV series)
Masonna
The Master of Go
Master Roshi
Ken Masters
Masuda, Shimane
Masudaya
Matama, Ōita
Matcha
Mathematics of paper folding
Takako Matsu
Matsubara, Osaka
Matsubase, Kumamoto
Matsubayashi-ryu
Matsudo, Chiba
Matsue, Shimane
Matsugaoka
Hideki Matsui
Iwane Matsui
Kazuo Matsui
Matsukata Masayoshi
Matsumoto
Matsumoto, Kagoshima
Yukihiro Matsumoto
Matsunaga Enzo
Matsunaga Hisahide
Matsuno, Ehime
Yasumi Matsuno
Matsunoyuki
Matsuo Bashō
Matsusaka, Mie
Matsushige, Tokushima
Matsushima, Kumamoto
Matsushita Electric Industrial Co.
Konosuke Matsushita
Matsutake
Yumi Matsutoya
Matsuura, Nagasaki
Matsuyama, Ehime
Matsuyama, Kagoshima
Daisuke Matsuzaka
Matsuzaki, Shizuoka
Matthew Calbraith Perry
Matto, Ishikawa
Mawashi
Mawatari Matsuko
Mazda
Mazda MX-3
Mazda RX-7
Mazda RX-8

Me
Meadow (programming)
Measure word
Mecha
Mechanical Engineering Heritage (Japan)
Mega Man (series)
Mega Man 64
Megami Tensei
Megatsunami
Meguro Station
Meguro, Tokyo
Meiji period
Meiji Constitution
Meiji Restoration
Meiji Shrine
Setsuna Meioh
Meiwa, Mie
Memories (1995 film)
Mentai Waido
Metal Gear (series)
Metal Gear 2: Solid Snake
Metal Gear Solid
Metal Gear Solid 2: Sons of Liberty
Metal Resistance
Metal Slug
Metroid
Metroid Fusion
Metroid Prime
Metroid Prime 2: Echoes
Metropolis (2001 movie)
Mew
Mew (Pokémon)
Mewtwo

Mi
Michiko
Midgar
Mido
Midori
Midori, Hyogo
Hikaru Midorikawa
Midoriko
Mie District, Mie
Mie Prefecture
Mie, Ōita
Mifune, Kumamoto
Mighty Morphin Power Rangers
Migration in Japan
Mighty the Armadillo
Mihama, Aichi
Mihama, Mie
Mihama, Wakayama
Mihara, Hiroshima
Mihara, Hyogo
Mihara, Kōchi
Mihara, Osaka
Mihara District, Hyogo
Mihonoseki, Shimane
Mii District, Fukuoka
Miike District, Fukuoka
Mikado
Mikame, Ehime
Mikamo, Okayama
Mikamo, Tokushima
Mikasa, Hokkaidō
Mikata, Hyogo
Mikata District, Hyogo
Mikatsuki, Saga
Mikawa Province
Mikawa, Ehime
Mikawa, Kumamoto
Mikawa, Yamaguchi
Mikazuki, Hyogo
Miki
Miki, Kagawa
Takeo Miki
Mikimoto Kōkichi
Mikumo, Mie
Haruhiko Mikimoto
Mikkabi, Shizuoka
Military history of Japan
Millennium Items
Mima, Ehime
Mima, Tokushima
Mima District, Tokushima
Mimasaka Province
Mimasaka, Okayama
Mimata, Miyazaki
Mimizuka
Minabe, Wakayama
Minabegawa, Wakayama
Minakata Kumagusu
Minakuchi, Shiga
Minamata, Kumamoto
Minamata disease
Minami Torishima
Minami-Alps, Yamanashi
Minami-ku
Minamiamabe District, Ōita
Minamiashigara, Kanagawa
Minamichita, Aichi
Minamidaitō, Okinawa
Minamiechizen, Fukui
Minamiizu, Shizuoka
Minamikawachi District, Osaka
Minamimuro District, Mie
Minaminaka District, Miyazaki
Yoko Minamino
Minamioguni, Kumamoto
Minamishitara District, Aichi
Minamitane, Kagoshima
Minamiuwa District, Ehime
Minamiyamashiro, Kyoto
Minamoto clan
Minamoto no Sanetomo
Minamoto no Yoriie
Minamoto no Yoritomo
Minamoto no Yoshinaka
Minamoto no Yoshitomo
Minamoto no Yoshitsune
Minato, Tokyo
Minato Mirai 21
Minato Mirai Line
Minato-ku, Nagoya
Minato-ku, Osaka
Mine District, Yamaguchi
Mine, Saga
Mine, Yamaguchi
Norman Mineta
Ministry of International Trade and Industry
Mino, Gifu
Mino, Kagawa
Mino, Tokushima
Mino District, Hyogo
Mino District, Shimane
Mino Province
Minokamo, Gifu
Minoh, Osaka
Yui Mizuno

Mi (cont'd)
Mirasaka, Hiroshima
Mirin
Miroku (InuYasha)
Misaki, Ehime
Misaki, Osaka
Misakubo, Shizuoka
Misasa, Tottori
Misato, Akita
Misato, Mie
Misato, Saitama
Misato, Tokushima
Misato, Wakayama
Misawa
Misawa Air Base
Misawa, Aomori
Mishima, Kagoshima
Mishima, Shizuoka
Yukio Mishima
Mishō, Ehime
Mishima District, Osaka
Mishima Sosen
Miso
Miso soup
Misono, Mie
Misty
Misugi, Mie
Yurika Misumaru
Misumi, Kumamoto
Misumi, Shimane
Misumi, Yamaguchi
Mitagawa, Saga
Mitaka, Tokyo
Mitake, Gifu
Mito, Ibaraki
Mito, Aichi
Mito, Shimane
Mito, Yamaguchi
Mitoya, Shimane
Mitoyo District, Kagawa
Mitsu District, Okayama
Mitsu, Hyogo
Mitsubishi
Mitsubishi A5M
Mitsubishi A7M
Mitsubishi Eclipse
Mitsubishi F-2
Mitsubishi F1M
Mitsubishi Fuso Truck & Bus Corporation
Mitsubishi G4M
Mitsubishi GTO
Mitsubishi Heavy Industries
Mitsubishi J8M
Mitsubishi Ki-202
Mitsubishi Lancer Evolution
Mitsubishi Motors Corporation
Mitsubishi T-2
Mitsubishi Zero
Yasunori Mitsuda
Mitsue, Nara
Mitsugi District, Hiroshima
Mitsugi, Hiroshima
Mitsuhashi, Fukuoka
Mitsui
Mitsui O.S.K. Lines
Kotono Mitsuishi
Mitsuke, Niigata
Mitsukoshi
Mitsuru Igarashi
Mitsuse, Saga
Mitsuteru Yokoyama
Miwa Yoshida
Miwa, Aichi
Miwa, Fukuoka
Miwa, Hiroshima
Miwa, Kyoto
Miwa, Yamaguchi
Miya Masaoka
Miya, Gifu
Miyagawa, Mie
Kazuo Miyagawa
Miyagi Prefecture
Miyahara, Kumamoto
Miyajima, Hiroshima
Miyake, Nara
Issey Miyake
Miyaki District, Saga
Miyako
Miyako District, Fukuoka
Miyako District, Okinawa
Miyakubo, Ehime
Miyanojo, Kagoshima
Miyakonojō, Miyazaki
Miyama, Kyoto
Miyama, Mie
Miyama, Wakayama
Miyamoto Musashi
Nobuko Miyamoto
Yuriko Miyamoto
Miyata, Fukuoka
Miyatake Gaikotsu
Miyazaki
Miyazaki District, Miyazaki
Hayao Miyazaki
Miyazaki Prefecture
Miyazaki, Miyazaki
Kenji Miyazawa
Kiichi Miyazawa
Rie Miyazawa
Miyazu, Kyoto
Miyoshi District, Tokushima
Miyoshi, Aichi
Miyoshi, Hiroshima
Miyoshi, Tokushima
Mizobe, Kagoshima
Kenji Mizoguchi
Mizokuchi, Tottori
Tetsuya Mizuguchi
Mizuho Bank
Mizuho Financial Group
Mizuho, Gifu
Mizuho, Kyoto
Mizuho, Shimane
Mizukami, Kumamoto
Mizuma District, Fukuoka
Mizuma, Fukuoka
Mizumaki, Fukuoka
Mizunami, Gifu
Ami Mizuno
Mizuno Nobumoto
Mizuno Tadakuni
Mizuno Tadashige
Mizusawa, Iwate

Mo
Mobara, Chiba
Mobile Suit Gundam
Mobile Suit Gundam: Char's Counterattack
Mobile Suit Gundam ZZ
Mobile Suit Victory Gundam
Mobile Suit Zeta Gundam
Moblog
Mochi (food)
Kaori Mochida
Mochigase, Tottori
Modern Love's Silliness
Moe (slang)
Mamoru Mohri
Moi dix Mois
Mojibake
Momotarō
Momoyama, Wakayama
Momozono
Monā
Mona Font
Monbetsu, Hokkaidō
Monkey (TV series)
Monobe, Kochi
Akiko Monō
Monster (manga)
Montevideo Maru
Mooka, Tochigi
Mora (linguistics)
Mori, Shizuoka
Mori Chack
Mōri clan
Mori Hiromichi
Ikue Mori
Masahiro Mori
Mōri Motonari
Mori Ōgai
Mōri Terumoto
Yoshirō Mori
Moriguchi, Osaka
Masaharu Morimoto
Morioka, Iwate
Akio Morita
Morita Shoma
Moriya, Ibaraki
Moriyama, Shiga
Daidō Moriyama
Morodomi, Saga
Morotsuka, Miyazaki
Hiroyuki Morioka
Mothra
Mothra vs Godzilla
Motobu, Okinawa
Motoori Norinaga
Motosu, Gifu
Motosu District, Gifu
Motoyama, Kōchi
Mount Fuji
Mount Fuji Jazz Festival
Mount Hiei
Mount Kōya
Mount Rokkō
Mount Suribachi
Mount Tsurugi (Tokushima)
Mount Tsurugi (Hokkaido)

Mr
Mr Driller
Mr. Baseball
Mr.Children
Mr. Game & Watch
Mr. Moto
Mr. Satan
Mr. Saturn

Ms
MSX

Mu
Mu (negative)
Mugegawa, Gifu
Mugi District, Gifu
Mugi, Gifu
Mugi, Tokushima
Muikaichi, Shimane
Mujo
Chiaki Mukai
Mukaishima, Hiroshima
Muko
Munakata District, Fukuoka
Munakata, Fukuoka
Municipalities of Japan
Municipality
Kazusa Murai
Murakami
Murakami, Niigata
Haruki Murakami
Ryū Murakami
Murakami Yoshikiyo
Muraoka, Hyōgo
Murasaki Shikibu
Murayama
Murayama Kaita
Tomiichi Murayama
Mure, Kagawa
Muro, Nara
Muromachi period
Muroran, Hokkaidō
Muroto, Kōchi
Musashi, Ōita
Musashi Province
Musashi University
Musashimaru Kōyō
Musashimurayama, Tokyo
Musashino, Tokyo
Mushiki
Music of Japan
Izumi Muto
Yugi Mutou
Japanese battleship Mutsu
Mutsu (nuclear ship)
Mutsu, Aomori
Mutsu Munemitsu
Mutsu Province
Mutsumi, Yamaguchi

My
My Neighbor Totoro
Myōdō District, Tokushima
Myoga
Myōzai District, Tokushima

M